Azanak-e Kukya (also Romanized as Āzanaḵ-e Kūḵyā) is a village in Seyyedvaliyeddin Rural District, Sardasht District, Andimeshk County, Khuzestan Province, Iran. At the 2006 census, its population was 24, in 4 families.

References 

Populated places in Andimeshk County